Happy Family is a 2010 Italian comedy film directed by Gabriele Salvatores. It was inspired by Luigi Pirandello's Six Characters in Search of an Author.

The film won the Best Editing award at the 2010 Nastro d'Argento ceremony.

Plot
Ezio is a screenwriter scared by happy endings, who earns his living thanks to an invention of his father. He is going through a creative crisis, until he has a car crash with Anna, who invites him to dinner. Once there, the stories of several characters get interwoven, triggered by the decision of the 16 year-old Filippo, Anna's son, to get married. Dinner's attendees become the characters of Ezio's new screenplay, but they will try to interfere with his work.

Cast
Fabrizio Bentivoglio: Vincenzo
Margherita Buy: Anna
Valeria Bilello: Caterina
Fabio De Luigi: Ezio
Corinna Agustoni: Grandmother Anna
Gianmaria Biancuzzi: Filippo
Alice Croci: Marta
Diego Abatantuono: Marta's father
Carla Signoris: Marta's mother
Sandra Milo: Ezio's mother

References

External links 

2010 films
Films directed by Gabriele Salvatores
Italian comedy films
2010 comedy films
2010s Italian-language films
2010s Italian films